Weathers is an American rock band from Los Angeles.

History

Formation
Lead vocalist Cameron Boyer and guitarist Cameron Olsen first met in 2012 at a local Battle of the Bands in Manhattan Beach. They later recruited bassist Brennen Bates and drummer Cole Carson. The band officially formed in Los Angeles in October 2015.

Debut singles (2015)
Weathers released singles "I Don't Wanna Know" and "Happy Pills" in 2015. "Happy Pills" was the most added song on alternative radio on its impact date, receiving the most adds for a new artist in the 2010s. "Happy Pills" peaked at No. 21 on the Billboard Alternative Songs chart.

Kids in the Night
Weathers debuted their album Kids In The Night (2016) in two separate EPs, Kids In The Night Part 1 and Kids In The Night Part 2. Lead singer Cameron Boyer said about the release of the first EP "It's about accepting your flaws and realizing that the so-called ‘bad' things about you are actually what shape you into who you are now — a stronger, better person. It's asking, ‘Are the bad things really bad or are they just temporarily hard?'".

Pillows and Therapy and departure of Carson
Following their debut album Kids in the Night, they released the singles "Dirty Money", "Problems" (and its acoustic version), "Lonely Vampire", and "Always Tired" in 2019, "Feel Good", "C'est la vie" and "Lucky" (together with Songs That Saved My Life) in 2020, "Losing Blood", "C'est la vie (Cinematic Mix)", and "Rehab" in 2021 of which "C'est la vie", "Losing Blood", and "Rehab" will be part of their upcoming album Pillows and Therapy. Weathers has toured supporting many alternative acts, including Saint Motel, Nothing but Thieves, Dreamers, Palaye Royale, One Ok Rock, Badflower, and Echosmith. Their headline American national tour of February 2021 has been moved to start in September 2021.

On 15 February 2022, the band announced via their Instagram page that drummer Cole Carson had left the band.

Band members 
 Cameron Boyer– lead vocals, rhythm guitar, piano, keyboards (2015–present)
 Cameron Olsen – lead guitar, backing vocals  (2015–present) 
 Brennen Bates – bass, backing vocals, piano, keyboards (2015–present)
 Cole Carson – drums, percussion, backing vocals (2015–2022)

Discography

Studio albums
Kids in the Night (2018)

Pillows and Therapy (2021)

EPs 
 Kids in the Night - Part 1 (2018)

 Kids in the Night - Part 2 (2018)

Singles

References

Alternative rock groups from California
Indie rock musical groups from California
Musical groups from Los Angeles
Musical groups established in 2015
2015 establishments in California